Francis (Franz) Huebschmann (April 19, 1817March 21, 1880) was a German American immigrant, physician, and Democratic politician.  He served four and a half years in the Wisconsin State Senate, representing the northern half of Milwaukee County, and was a noted surgeon for the Union Army during the American Civil War.

Biography
Francis Huebschmann was born in Riethnordhausen, in what was then the Grand Duchy of Saxe-Weimar-Eisenach (in modern-day Germany).  He was educated at Erfurt and Weimar, and graduated in medicine at Jena in 1841.

He came to the United States in 1842, and settled in Milwaukee, where he resided until his death.

He was school commissioner from 1843 until 1851, a member of the first Wisconsin Constitutional Convention of 1846, and served on the committee on suffrage and elective franchise. He was a special champion of the provision in the constitution granting foreigners equal rights with Americans. He was Democratic Party presidential elector in 1848, for Lewis Cass, a member of the Milwaukee City Council and a Milwaukee County supervisor from 1848 until 1867. He served three periods as Wisconsin State Senator, first from 1851 to 1852, second in 1862, and finally frrom 1871 to 1872. From 1853 until 1857, he was superintendent of the affairs of the Native Americans of the northern United States.

During the Civil War, he entered the Union Army in 1862 as surgeon of the 26th Wisconsin Infantry Regiment. He was surgeon in charge of a division at the Battle of Chancellorsville, and of the XI Corps at Gettysburg, where he was held by the Confederates for three days. He was also at the Battle of Chattanooga, in charge of the Corps hospital in Lookout Valley in 1864, and brigade surgeon in the Atlanta Campaign. He was honorably discharged in that year, and, returning to Milwaukee, became connected with the United States General Hospital.

References

External links

1817 births
1880 deaths
Physicians from Wisconsin
University of Jena alumni
Politicians from Milwaukee
German emigrants to the United States
People of Wisconsin in the American Civil War
Wisconsin city council members
County supervisors in Wisconsin
Wisconsin state senators
19th-century American politicians
Union Army surgeons